Rock n' Bolt is a puzzle video game developed by Action Graphics and published in 1984 by Activision for ColecoVision, Commodore 64, MSX, and SG-1000.

Gameplay

The objective of the game is to lock platforms into place according to a supplied map. There are three levels of difficulty; the second and third level have time limits.

Reception
Computer and Video Games rated the ColecoVision version 86% in 1989.

References

External links

Rock n' Bolt at Generation-MSX

1984 video games
Activision games
ColecoVision games
Commodore 64 games
SG-1000 games
MSX games
Video games developed in the United States